Boghuma Kabisen Titanji is a Cameroonian medical doctor and clinical researcher. She is an expert on HIV drug resistant viruses.

Education and work 
Boghuma Kabisen Titanji, clinically trained in Cameroon, received her MSc and DTM&H in Tropical Medicine and International Health from the London School of Hygiene & Tropical Medicine in 2010 and a PhD in Infectious Diseases studying HIV-1 cell-to-cell spread and Antiretroviral therapy drug resistance from University College London in 2014. Titanji's work focuses on the mechanisms of HIV transmission and antiretroviral drug resistance. In May 2012, she gave a TED Talk on the ethics of medical research in Africa.

Recognition and awards 

 2012  Titanji was awarded a Commonwealth Scholarship
 2014: Titanji was named one of the BBC 100 Women for her work on the advancement of ethically sound research

Selected publications 

 Boghuma Kabisen Titanji, Deenan Pillay1, Clare Jolly (May 2017) "Antiretroviral therapy and cell–cell spread of wild-type and drug-resistant human immunodeficiency virus-1", 5 May 2017, Journal of General Virology 98: 821–834, doi: 10.1099/jgv.0.000728 
 Boghuma Kabisen Titanji Marlen Aasa-Chapman, Deenan Pillay and Clare Jolly (Dec 2013) "Protease inhibitors effectively block cell-to-cell spread of HIV-1 between T cells", Retrovirology. 2013; 10: 161. Published online 2013 Dec 24. doi:  10.1186/1742-4690-10-161

References 

Living people
Cameroonian physicians
Year of birth missing (living people)
BBC 100 Women
People from Yaoundé
Alumni of the London School of Hygiene & Tropical Medicine
Alumni of University College London
Medical researchers
Women medical researchers
21st-century physicians
21st-century women physicians